Sadovoye is a village in Chüy Region of Kyrgyzstan established in 1908  It is part of the Moskva District. Its population was 10,545 in 2021.

Population

References

Populated places in Chüy Region